Maku (Máku, Makú), Magu or Makku may refer to:

Places

Iran
 Dar-e Maku, a village in Hormozgan Province
 Maku, Chaldoran, Poldasht and Showt (electoral district), West Azarbaijan Province
 Maku County, West Azarbaijan Province
 Maku, Iran, a city in West Azarbaijan Province
 Maku Kandi, a village in West Azerbaijan Province

Other places
 Maku (Armenia), a region in ancient Armenia
 Maku, Ukhrul, a village in Manipur state, India

Other uses
 Maku people, several peoples and languages of South America
 Magu (deity), also spelled Ma-ku, a goddess in China
 Maku, the name for the witchetty grub in the Pitjantjatjara language in central Australia
 Maku International Airport, West Azerbaijan Province, Iran
 Maku Khanate, a historical polity that existed from 1747 to 1922
 Maku River, a tributary of the Barak River, Manipur, India

See also
 Macu (disambiguation)
 Maqu (disambiguation)